Pselnophorus pachyceros is a moth of the family Pterophoridae that is known from Mozambique and South Africa.

References

Oidaematophorini
Lepidoptera of Mozambique
Lepidoptera of South Africa
Moths of Sub-Saharan Africa
Moths described in 1921